Ursberg is a municipality in the district of Günzburg in Bavaria in Germany.

Nearby is Ursberg Abbey, a former Imperial Abbey of the Holy Roman Empire.

Notable residents
Theo Waigel, former Chairperson of the Christian Social Union of Bavaria party and Federal Minister of Finance of Germany.

References

Populated places in Günzburg (district)